Mikhail Sorokin  is a ski-orienteering competitor who has competed for Russia and Kazakhstan. He won a bronze medal at the Junior World Ski Orienteering Championships in 2001. He competed for Russia at the 2009 World Ski Orienteering Championships in Rusutsu, where he placed 12th in the long distance. Competing for Kazakhstan, he won a gold medal in sprint at the 2011 Asian Winter Games, ahead of Alexandr Babenko.

References

Year of birth missing (living people)
Living people
Russian orienteers
Male orienteers
Kazakhstani sportspeople
Ski-orienteers
Asian Games medalists in ski orienteering
Ski-orienteers at the 2011 Asian Winter Games
Asian Games gold medalists for Kazakhstan

Medalists at the 2011 Asian Winter Games